Alan or Allen may refer to:

Alan Campbell (actor) (born 1957), actor known for his role as Derek Mitchell on the TV series Jake and the Fatman
Alan Campbell (footballer, born 1944) (born 1944), Northern Irish footballer
Alan Campbell (Gaelic footballer) (born 1991), Irish Gaelic football player
Alan Campbell (Irish footballer) (born 1960), former Republic of Ireland international footballer
Alan Campbell (pastor) (1949–2017), Pentecostal pastor in Belfast, Northern Ireland
Sir Alan Campbell (politician) (born 1957), British Labour Party Member of Parliament
Alan Campbell (rower) (born 1983), British Olympic rower
Alan Campbell (Scottish footballer) (born 1948), former Scottish football midfielder
Alan Campbell (screenwriter) (1904–1963), married to Dorothy Parker
Alan Campbell (writer) (born 1971), author of the novels Scar Night and Iron Angel
Alan Campbell, Baron Campbell of Alloway (1917–2013), British judge and life peer
Sir Alan Campbell (diplomat) (1919–2007), British ambassador to Ethiopia and Italy
Allen Campbell (1956–1994), elephant trainer
Allen G. Campbell, delegate from Utah Territory to the U.S. House of Representatives
Alan K. Campbell (1923–1998), former director of the US Office of Personnel Management

See also 
Al Campbell (disambiguation)
Allan Campbell (disambiguation)
Alan Campbell-Swinton